Saint-Gouéno is a former commune in the Côtes-d'Armor department of Brittany in northwestern France. On 1 January 2016, it was merged into the new commune Le Mené.

Population

Inhabitants of Saint-Gouéno are called gouénovais in French.

See also
 Communes of the Côtes-d'Armor department

References

Former communes of Côtes-d'Armor